St Sampson's High School is a state-funded secondary school in Guernsey that caters to the needs of pupils from eleven to sixteen. The school is co-located with special-school Le Murier in the parish of St Sampson.

History 

St Sampson's High School was opened in 2008, to serve as a replacement to the old St Sampson's secondary school, and the St Peter Port secondary school. Both the original schools have now been transformed into colleges of further education, while their pupils have moved to the newer St Sampson's High.

Difficulties

Educational 
Problems in the Guernsey state-funded schools have been highlighted in the Mulkerrin report on the Education Services in Guernsey. The report claims that the percentage of St Sampson's High School students who attained five A*–C GCSE grades in 2011 was only 38%.

In 2016, St Sampsons High students received 42% of grades from A*–C grade, 10% more than the previous year.

See also
 List of schools in Guernsey

References

Secondary schools in the Channel Islands
Schools in Guernsey